The 2014 3 Hours of Inje was an endurance motor race held at the Inje Speedium in Inje County, South Korea on 18–20 July 2014. The race was the first round of the 2014 Asian Le Mans Series season. Defending series champions David Cheng and Ho-Pin Tung of OAK Racing Team Total won the race overall after their LMP2 class competitors Eurasia Motorsport crashed in the closing stages of the race. Mathias Beche, Kevin Tse, and Frank Yu of Craft-Bamboo Racing won the first race for the CN category in the Asian Le Mans Series, while AAI-Rstrada had a 1–2–3 finish in the GT category, led by Hanchen Chen, Ryohei Sakaguchi, and Marco Seefried.

Race result
Race result is as follows. Class winners in bold.

References

External links
 

Inje
Inje
3 Hours of Inje